Hartland High School is a public high school located in Hartland Township, near the historic village of Hartland, within Livingston County, Michigan. The school serves over 1,500 students in grades 9 to 12 in the Hartland Consolidated Schools district. Hartland High School offers a variety of classes for students to choose; the standard high school track, an advanced placement program which offers college credit, college preparatory courses for students likely to pursue higher education, career-based tracks for those likely to enter the labor force immediately upon graduation, and woodshop.

Athletics
Hartland High School athletics changed conferences from the Kensington Valley Conference to the Kensington Lakes Activities Association at the beginning of the 2008 school year.

References

Public high schools in Michigan
Schools in Livingston County, Michigan